Yeolmae Food (hangul:열매식품) is a food company. Its headquarters are located in Gunpo Gyeonggi-do, Korea. Established in 1991, it manufactures many home food products.  It has agency offices in Suwon, Gwangju, Busan, Daegu.

History
1991:Yeolmae Food established
1993:Change the corporation from Yeolmae Food Co., Ltd., Participate in Seoul World Food Exhibition
1994:Participate in Japan World Food Exhibition, Member of Korea Food Processing Association
1995:Participate in Seoul World Food Exhibition
1996:Purchase the Headquarter body
1997:Participate in Taipei, Chinese World Food Exhibition, Export USD $500,000.00
1998:Export to LA in US, Taipei / USD $800,000.00
1999:Participate in Hong Kong, Japan, China World Food Exhibition, Export to China, Taipei / USD $2,000,000.00
2000:Participate in Singapore World Food Exhibition, Participate in Taipei World Food Exhibition, Planning to participate in Hong Kong World Food Exhibition, Export to Singapore, Taiwan, China / USD $2,100,000.00
2001:Export to Singapore, Taiwan, China, Malaysia / USD $2,200,000.00
2002:Export to Canada, Japan, Singapore, Taiwan / USD $2,350,000.00, Acquired ISO 9001 Certification

Business count
2001:$22,000,000.00
2002:$23,500,000.00
2003:$26,000,000.00

Exportation
Taiwan, U.S., Singapore, China, Malaysia, Canada, Japan, Australia, Europe and South America

Products
Jomi Kim
Kimbap Kim
Miyeok
Gift Set
Sesame & Food Oil
Sesame

See also
Economy of South Korea

External links
Yeolmae Food Homepage(in Korean) 
Yeolmae Kim Product Homepage(in Korean) 

Food and drink companies of South Korea
Food manufacturers of South Korea